Mona is a hamlet in Anglesey, in north-west Wales.

To the north west of the hamlet lies RAF Mona, a relief airfield for RAF Valley.

References

Villages in Anglesey
Llangristiolus